Zardar may refer to:
 Zardar, Kerman
 Zardar, Tehran